Jakheen Gilmore (born August 25, 1983) is a former wide receiver for Indiana University.

High school years
Gilmore attended Poly Prep Country Day School in Brooklyn, New York and was a student and a letterman in football and track. In football, he was an All-City selection and an All-State selection.

Current
Gilmore currently resides in Bloomington, Indiana with wife Eva Griffin Gilmore and their son Josiah. He is also a Wide Receiver in free agency. Played for the NFL Carolina Panthers back in 2007. Now runs a very successful performance training business called iChallenge Performance training.

References
IU Hoosiers bio

1983 births
Living people
American football wide receivers
Indiana Hoosiers football players
People from Brooklyn
Poly Prep alumni
People from Bloomington, Indiana